Damien Margat (born 10 April 1983) is a French lightweight rower. He won a gold medal at the 2004 World Rowing Championships in Banyoles with the lightweight men's eight.

References

1983 births
Living people
French male rowers
World Rowing Championships medalists for France